The March 2014 nor'easter was an extremely powerful extratropical cyclone that affected much of U.S. Gulf Coast, the eastern United States, eastern Canada, and Greenland. It was the most powerful winter storm of the 2013–14 North American winter storm season, being an unusually large winter storm as well, with its gale-force wind field becoming four times larger than that of Hurricane Sandy's extratropical remnant. The storm affected various parts of the Midwest, most of the Eastern Seaboard (especially New England), as well as eastern Canada, bringing extremely powerful winds (reaching hurricane-force in some areas), and blizzard-like conditions.

Meteorological history
On March 24, an extratropical disturbance developed in the Gulf of Mexico, just off the coast of South Texas. Within a day, the developing storm crossed over Florida, before emerging off the east coast of the Southeastern United States on March 25. Late on March 25, the winter storm emerged off the coast of the Southeastern United States and began to undergo explosive intensification, becoming a bomb cyclone by March 26, and absorbing another weaker winter storm to the west in the process. However, the storm's path remained off-shore, which resulted in relatively minor impacts to most of the Northeastern United States. Despite the storm's distance from the coast, the system caused wind damage and blizzard-like conditions across New England and eastern Canada. Powered by moisture coming from the Gulf of Mexico, as well as the opposing air masses, the storm quickly became a superstorm with a gale-force wind field four times larger than that of Superstorm Sandy, during the extratropical duration of the latter system, which was extremely unusual for a storm at that time of the year. Early on March 27, the superstorm made landfall on Nova Scotia and weakened to a strong nor'easter. The storm continued to move towards the north, while gradually beginning to weaken. Later on the same day, the nor'easter weakened to a  storm and moved northward into the Labrador Sea. On March 28, the storm stalled in the middle of the Labrador Sea. Early on March 29, the nor'easter weakened further to a  disorganized extratropical storm, even resumed a slow eastward track. Later on the same day, the northern part of the system reached Disko Bay, even as it continued to deteriorate. Early on the next day, the storm's center of circulation collapsed as the system became elongated, due to its interaction with a ridge of high pressure over Greenland, even while the system's center of circulation remained off the east coast of Greenland and stalled, weakening to a  low. Several hours later, the storm's remnants were absorbed into a frontal zone.

Impacts
The snow at Dulles Airport helped push them to their snowiest March on record.

Snowfall totals
North Carolina
The highest snowfall total reported was 12.2 inches near Bleech Mountain.

Kentucky
The highest snowfall total reported was 12 inches at Black Mountain, Kentucky.

West Virginia
The highest snowfall total reported was 7.5 inches near Davis.

New Jersey
The highest snowfall total reported was 7.2 inches in Dennisville.

Virginia
The highest snowfall total reported was 7 inches near Lynchburg.

Delaware
The highest snowfall total reported was 7 inches in Frankford.

See also 

 January 2008 North American storm complex
 October 2009 North American storm complex
 March 2010 North American winter storm
 December 2010 North American blizzard
 November 2011 Bering Sea cyclone
 February 2013 nor'easter
 March 2013 nor'easter
 Early 2014 North American cold wave
 February 11–17, 2014 North American winter storm
 March 2014 North American winter storm
 November 2014 Bering Sea cyclone
 December 2014 North American storm complex
 January 2015 North American blizzard
 January 2018 North American blizzard – An extremely powerful nor'easter that surpassed this storm in intensity
 March 1–3, 2018 nor'easter
 El Niño
 La Niña

References

External links 
 Additional Information on the U.S. Winter Storms of 2013–2014

2014 in Texas
2014 in Louisiana
2014 in Mississippi
2014 in Alabama
2014 in Florida
2014 in Georgia (U.S. state)
2014 in Kentucky
2014 in Maryland
2014 in Delaware
2014 in North Carolina
2014 in South Carolina
2014 in West Virginia
2014 in Virginia
2014 in Pennsylvania
2014 in New Jersey
2014 in New York (state)
2014 in Vermont
2014 in New Hampshire
2014 in Massachusetts
2014 in Connecticut
2014 in Rhode Island
2014 in Maine
2014 in Canada
Blizzards in the United States
March 2014 nor'easter